Mahuatand is a village in the Gomia CD block in the Bermo subdivision of the Bokaro district in the Indian state of Jharkhand.

Geography

Location
Mahuatand is located at

Area overview
Bokaro district consists of undulating uplands on the Chota Nagpur Plateau with the Damodar River cutting a valley right across. The East Bokaro Coalfield located in the Bermo-Phusro area and small intrusions of Jharia Coalfield make Bokaro a coal rich district. In 1965, one of the largest steel manufacturing units in the country, Bokaro Steel Plant, operated by Steel Authority of India Limited, was set-up at Bokaro Steel City. The Damodar Valley Corporation established its first thermal power station at Bokaro (Thermal). The soil is generally infertile and agriculture is mostly rain-fed.

Note: The map alongside presents some of the notable locations in the district. All places marked in the map are linked in the larger full screen map.

Civic administration

Police station
Mahuatand police station is located at Mahuatand.

Demographics
According to the 2011 Census of India, Mahuatand had a total population of 3,554 of which 1,867 (52%) were males and 1,690 (48%) were females. Population in the age range 0-6 years was 542. The total number of literate persons in Mahuatand was 1,792 (84.75% of the population over 6 years).

References

Villages in Bokaro district